Frogtown is an unincorporated community on Morgan Mill Stream in Clarke County, Virginia. Frogtown is located on Frogtown Road (VA 649).

Unincorporated communities in Clarke County, Virginia
Unincorporated communities in Virginia